This is a list of gliders/sailplanes of the world, (this reference lists all gliders with references, where available) 
Note: Any aircraft can glide for a short time, but gliders are designed to glide for longer.

Swiss miscellaneous constructors 

 Ae.C.S. Zögling Aero-Club Suisse
 Aecherli HAFA-9 AECHERLI, Hermann
 Aecherli Pfau 7 AECHERLI, Hermann & FARN...
 Aecherli Pfau – Hermann Aecherli & Willy Farner
 Amstutz Thun – E. Amstutz, H. Belart & H. von Travel, Bern
 Amstutz Thun BLASER & LERGIER, L.
 Caps I
 Chardon Biplan 1922 – Francis Chardon – Switzerland
 Chardon Biplan 1922 CHARDON, Francis
 Chardon Monoplan 1922 – Francis Chardon – Switzerland
 Chardon Monoplan 1922 CHARDON, Francis
 Cosandey Pou Planeur – Swiss – Louis Cosandey
 Cosandey Pou Planeur COSANDEY, Louis
 Domenjoz Planeur-Voilier
 Drückspatz II
 EFF Prometheus I
 EFF Prometheus II
 EFW N-20.01 – Eidgenössische Flugzeugwerke Emmen
 Elsässer Röbi ELSÄSSER, E. & OBRECHT,...
 F+W N-20.1 WIEHL, Herbert
 FFA Diamant 18 BIRCHER, Thomas & Von VO...
 FFA Diamant – Flug- und Fahrzeugwerke Altenrhein AG variants HBV, Diamant 16.5, Diamant 18 Flachsmann F-1 FLACHSMANN, Karl
 Flachsmann F-2 FLACHSMANN, Karl
 GBMZ Zögling
 GBMZ Zögling HUG, August
 Guignard 1934 GUIGNARD, Donat
 Guignard Chanute – Donat Guignard
 Hatherleigh CAVOK
 HBV Diamant BIRCHER, Thomas & Von VO...
 Hütter H-30 TS HÜTTER, Ulrich
 Jenni 1931 glider
 Jenni 1931
 Ka-Bi-Vo –  Federal Institute of Technology – (Eidgenössische Technische Hochschule Zürich)
 Kopp Ko III
 Liwentaal Aerostat – Alexandre Liwentaal
 Lost (glider) – Jakob Spalinger & Fritz Stamer & Alexander Lippisch – Martin & Hessel
 Müller M-2 – K. Müller
 OVL Austria – Fritz Müller – Ostschweizer Verein für Luftfahrt e. V., Zürich
 OVL Zurivogel – Fritz Müller – Ostschweizer Verein für Luftfahrt e. V., Zürich
 OVL Zurivogel MÜLLER, Fritz
 Pilatus B-4 – Pilatus Aircraft
 Robi (glider) – Elsaesser, Obrecht & Huegli
 Ruppert Archaeopteryx – Ruppert Composite GmbH
 Scherler HS-1 – Hermann Scherler and SG Biel
 Scherler HS-1 SCHERLER, Hermann
 Spengler HS3 Skikarus – Hans Spengler
 Studer WS-1 Habicht –  Walter Studer
 Studer-Sägesser WS-1 Lilli
 Studer-Sägesser WS-1 – Walter Studer & Rudolf Sägesser
 Thuner-Gleiter – A. Haefli & L. Lergier
 Vetterli Sperber – Ernst Vetterli
 Vol-au-Vent (glider) – Club genevois d'aviation 1910
 Vol-au-Vent
 WLM-1 – Rudolf Sägesser- Isler & Co, Wildegg
 WLM-1 SÄGESSER, Rudolf
 WLM-2 – WLM Flugingenieure – H. Sägesser, Flugzeugbbau, Herzogenbuchsee
 WLM-2 WLM Flugingenieure
 Zaunkönig (glider) – Karl  Huber & Ernst Schmid
 Zögling Ae.C.S. – Aero-Club Suisse''

Notes

Further reading

External links

Lists of glider aircraft